HMCS Wetaskiwin was a  of the Royal Canadian Navy that served during the Second World War. She served primarily as a convoy escort in the Battle of the Atlantic. She was named after the city of Wetaskiwin, Alberta. Wetaskiwin was the first Pacific coast built corvette to enter service with the Royal Canadian Navy.

Background

Flower-class corvettes like Wetaskiwin serving with the Royal Canadian Navy during the Second World War were different from earlier and more traditional sail-driven corvettes. The "corvette" designation was created by the French for classes of small warships; the Royal Navy borrowed the term for a period but discontinued its use in 1877. During the hurried preparations for war in the late 1930s, Winston Churchill reactivated the corvette class, needing a name for smaller ships used in an escort capacity, in this case based on a whaling ship design. The generic name "flower" was used to designate the class of these ships, which – in the Royal Navy – were named after flowering plants.

Corvettes commissioned by the Royal Canadian Navy during the Second World War were named after communities for the most part, to better represent the people who took part in building them. This idea was put forth by Admiral Percy W. Nelles. Sponsors were commonly associated with the community for which the ship was named. Royal Navy corvettes were designed as open sea escorts, while Canadian corvettes were developed for coastal auxiliary roles which was exemplified by their minesweeping gear. Eventually the Canadian corvettes would be modified to allow them to perform better on the open seas.

Construction
Originally named Banff for Banff, Alberta, she was ordered 14 February 1940 as part of the 1939-1940 Flower-class building program. She was laid down by Burrard Dry Dock Co. Ltd. in North Vancouver on 11 April 1940 and launched on 18 July 1940. Before commissioning her name was changed due to a name conflict with a Royal Navy vessel and she was commissioned as Wetaskiwin on 17 December 1940 at Esquimalt, British Columbia.

During her career, Wetaskiwin had three significant refits. The first began in February 1942 at Liverpool, Nova Scotia. The second began in mid-January 1943 and was completed in March at Liverpool. Further repairs were needed at Halifax after the refit was completed. In December 1943, Wetaskiwin was sent to Galveston, Texas to refit. This refit took until 6 March 1944 during which her fo'c'sle was extended. It was to be her final major refit of the war.

War duty
After working up in the Pacific, Wetaskiwin was transferred to the Atlantic Ocean in March 1941. She arrived at Halifax 13 April 1941. In May she was assigned to the Newfoundland Escort Force as a convoy escort on the route between St. John's and Iceland. She remained with this unit until January 1942, when she departed for refit. During this assignment, Wetaskiwin participated in the battles for convoy SC 42 in September 1941 and convoy SC 48 in October 1941.

After returning to service, Wetaskiwin joined the Mid-Ocean Escort Force (MOEF) escort group C-3. She also participated in the battle for Convoy SC 109.

After yard overhaul, Wetaskiwin was assigned to MOEF escort group A-3 for the battle of Convoy HX 233. When group A3 disbanded, Wetaskiwin was assigned to MOEF group C-5 in May 1943 and participated in the battle for Convoy HX 305.  Wetaskiwin escorted North American coastal convoys with the Western Local Escort Force (WLEF) from October 1944 until May 1945. As a member of WLEF she was assigned to escort group W-7 for the majority of her time with the force.

Trans-Atlantic convoys escorted

Post-war service

Following the end of hostilities, Wetaskiwin was paid off at Sorel, Quebec 19 June 1945. In 1946 she was sold to the Venezuelan Navy and renamed Victoria. She was discarded and sold for scrapping in 1962.

Ship's badge

Between 1910 and 1948, there were no official badges or insignia for the Royal Canadian Navy's ships. During the Second World War, many ships in the rapidly expanding RCN had an unofficial badge, often using humorous imagery or cartoon characters and other references to popular culture. In the case of corvettes, they were usually mounted on the shield for the ship's 4-inch gun or on the outside of the bridge. Wetaskiwins badge featured a queen of hearts sitting in a puddle of water, which was a reference to the ship's nickname: "Wet Ass Queen".

The original "wet ass queen" painting from the Wetaskiwin's wardroom bulkhead hangs on the wall at the Crow's Nest Officer's Club in St. John's Newfoundland.  . The reproduction was painted by Burnie Forbes, a rating (ordinary seaman), at the request of the Wetaskiwin's CO, in 1942. Because Forbes was not an officer, he was not permitted in the club to see the original and had to paint the gun shield based on descriptions of the original from the ship's officers.

A mural of HMCS Wetaskiwin adorns the side of the Royal Canadian Legion hall in Wetaskiwin, Alberta.

References

Ships of the Royal Canadian Navy
Flower-class corvettes of the Royal Canadian Navy
1940 ships
Corvettes of the Cold War